Ramsund  may refer to:

Places
Ramsund, Norway, a village in Tjeldsund municipality, Nordland county, Norway
Ramsund Chapel, a chapel in Tjeldsund municipality, Nordland county, Norway
Ramsund Bridge, a bridge in Tjeldsund municipality, Nordland county, Norway
Ramsund naval base, a Royal Norwegian Navy base
Ramsund, Sweden, a place in Eskilstuna Municipality, Sweden

Other
Ramsund carving, a runic stone carving in Ramsund, Sweden